John Norvell (December 21, 1789April 24, 1850) was a newspaper editor and one of the first U.S. Senators from Michigan.

History
Norvell was born in Danville, Kentucky, then still a part of Virginia, where he attended the common schools.

He is the son of Lt. Lipscomb Norvell, an officer of the Virginia Line in the American Revolutionary War, and Mary Hendrick. Lipscomb Norvell was taken prisoner by the British when they captured Charleston, South Carolina, in 1781 and later was an original member of the Society of the Cincinnati. Lipscomb is buried in the Nashville City Cemetery in Nashville, Tennessee.

Lipscomb descended from Captain Hugh Norvell (1666–1719), one of the original trustees of the City of Williamsburg in the 17th century and a Vestryman at Bruton Parish Church. Mary Norvell, Lipscomb's daughter, married James Walker, the father of William Walker (1824–1860) a soldier of fortune or filibusterer in Nicaragua in 1857.

In 1807, Norvell wrote to U.S. President Thomas Jefferson:

He received a reply in which Jefferson first recommended authors to read on government and history, then issued a scathing critique of newspapers:

Despite Jefferson's highly skeptical appraisal, Norvell apparently took his words as a challenge to reform newspapers and decided to learn the printing trade. Norvell did not publish this letter until after Jefferson's death in 1826, the original letter is now lost, but was in his son's possession as late as 1880.

Norvell edited the Baltimore Whig 1813–1814. He also studied law, was admitted to the bar in 1814, and began a private practice in Baltimore, Maryland. He enlisted as a private in the War of 1812, serving in the Battle of Bladensburg.

Norvell's adventures during the War of 1812 were chronicled in the Some Account of the Life of Spencer Houghton Cone, A Baptist Preacher in America. Norvell and his brother in law Spencer Cone were partners in Baltimore and together at the Battle of Bladensburg. After the battle, they returned to Washington to rescue their wives, who had been left there.

In Washington a scene of terror greeted Norvell and Cone. Catherine Cone Norvell was 8 months pregnant and could only travel by wagon. They attempted to walk out of the city, but Cone's feet were badly blistered and he found it impossible to move. Norvell found a pony in a neighboring field and caught him. Cone mounted him and they were once again on their way. Stopping at the White House, they asked one of the slaves for a drink. Thus refreshed, they crossed the Potomac and proceeded out of the city for three miles. They were so exhausted that they fell asleep even before they had finished their meager meal, sleeping on the bag of clothes spread out on the floor. While the men slept, Amelia, Cone's wife, awoke and went out into the garden—in the distance she could see the burning White House and Capitol building.

After the war, Norvell worked at various newspapers in several cities, including: the Baltimore Patriot 1815–1817. Norvell stayed with the Patriot almost two years before abruptly moving back to Kentucky, possibly with the encouragement of Henry Clay, where he took over the state's oldest newspaper, the Lexington Kentucky Gazette in 1817. For nearly the next two years, he maintained Clay's support at home, which earned Norvell apparently no great pecuniary rewards. By early in that year, he was again applying for clerkships in Washington, and soon moved east to Philadelphia, where he became editor of an Anti-Federalist newspaper. By 1819, he joined the Franklin Gazette, which he published with Richard Bache Jr., the brother of Benjamin Franklin Bache, and grandson of Benjamin Franklin. The Franklin Gazette, which supported Jefferson politically, was published in offices "at 180 the first door on the left hand side of Carpenter's lane, leading from the Post Office to the Bank of the United States."

In June 1829, Norvell and John R. Walker co-founded the Pennsylvania Inquirer, which was to become The Philadelphia Inquirer, although they had to sell the paper in November to Jesper Harding. Norvell continued to work in newspapers when he was appointed to an office in the Treasury Department by his friend Alexander J. Dallas, who was secretary of the treasury for President James Madison.

In Michigan
In 1831, Norvell moved to Michigan Territory after being appointed postmaster of Detroit by Andrew Jackson. Norvell was awarded the post because of his support of U.S. President Andrew Jackson, as were many other printers who had supported the Republican (democratic) party. He served as postmaster until 1836. The people in the Michigan Territory had approved a constitution and elected state officials in 1835, although it was not admitted as a state until 1837 because of a conflict known as the Toledo War with neighboring Ohio. Norvell was selected to be Senator in 1835. However, because the state of Michigan had not been recognized, he was only granted "spectator" status.

Norvell was an influential and active participant in the first constitutional convention in 1835. He was a member of the Board of Regents of the University of Michigan from 1837 to 1839.

Upon the admission of Michigan as a State into the Union, Norvell entered the U.S. Senate with the Jacksonian wing of the Democratic-Republican Party. He served one term in the 24th, 25th, and 26th congresses from January 26, 1837 to March 3, 1841. He did not seek reelection and resumed the practice of law in Detroit. Norvell was a member of the State senate in 1841 and of the State house of representatives in 1842. He served as United States district attorney in Michigan from 1846 to 1849.

Personal
Norvell had ten sons by three wives. His third wife, Isabella Hodgkiss Freeman (1804–1873) was the adopted daughter of Tristram B. Freeman, a noted Philadelphia printer and founder of the Freeman auction house. Her parents were Michael Hodgkiss and Sarah DeWeese. With Isabella, Norvell fathered two daughters and eight sons, one fought in the Mexican–American War and six fought in the American Civil War. They all survived the war. Colonel Freeman Norvell, was a Marine Lieutenant who fought at the Battle of Chapultepec in September 1847 and in the Civil War at the Battle of Gettysburg in 1863. Freeman's younger brother Lt. Dallas Norvell served on the staff of General George Custer. Another son, Colonel Stevens Thompson Norvell was an officer with the 10th Cavalry Buffalo Soldiers after the war and at the Battle of San Juan Hill with Theodore Roosevelt during the Spanish American War. Norvell's older daughter Isabella Gibson Norvell married Capt. Angus Keith, a Great Lakes boat captain, and the younger daughter Emily Virginia Norvell married Henry Nelson Walker, a newspaper owner, lawyer, and attorney general of Michigan.

Norvell died in Detroit on April 24, 1850, the day that news came from Washington that he had been appointed U.S. Consul to Turkey. He is interred in Elmwood Cemetery in Detroit. Norvell Township in Jackson County, Michigan, is named for him.

References
Notes

Sources
 Goodwin, William A., The Record of Bruton Parish Church, Richmond, Virginia, 1941.
 Hemans, Lawton T., The Life and Times of Stevens Thompson Mason, Lansing, Michigan, 1920.
 Streeter, Floyd Benjamin, Political Parties in Michigan 1837-1860, Lansing, Michigan, 1918.
 Pasley, Jeffrey, The Tyranny of Printers: Newspaper Politics in the Early American Republic. Charlottesville: University of Virginia Press, 2001.
 Pasley, Jeffrey, "The 'Indiscreet Zeal' of John Norvell: Newspaper Publishing and Politics in the Early Republic." Paper read at the annual meeting of the Organization of American Historians, Atlanta, Ga., April 14, 1994.
 Norvell, Colonel Freeman, "History and Times of the Hon. John Norvell" Michigan Pioneer Collections, Lansing Michigan, 1881.

External links
 
 John Norvell facsimile pages from Michigan Biographies, Michigan Historical Commission, 1924
 Jefferson's letter to Norvell
 John Norvell entry at The Political Graveyard
 

|-

1789 births
1850 deaths
19th-century American lawyers
19th-century American newspaper editors
19th-century American politicians
American male journalists
Burials at Elmwood Cemetery (Detroit)
Democratic Party United States senators from Michigan
Democratic-Republican Party United States senators
Maryland lawyers
Democratic Party members of the Michigan House of Representatives
Michigan Democratic-Republicans
Michigan Jacksonians
Michigan lawyers
Michigan postmasters
Democratic Party Michigan state senators
Michigan Territory officials
John
Politicians from Danville, Kentucky
Politicians from Detroit
Regents of the University of Michigan
The Philadelphia Inquirer people
United States Army personnel of the War of 1812
United States Attorneys
Delegates to the 1835 Michigan Constitutional Convention